Blastobasis lacticolella is a species of moth of the  family Blastobasidae. It was introduced in western Europe and is now reported from the Netherlands, Great Britain , Ireland and Madeira.

Description
The wingspan is 18–21 mm. Adults are on wing from May to June and again in autumn.

The larvae feed on a wide variety of food types, including leaf-litter, vegetation and stored products.

References

Blastobasis
Moths described in 1940
Moths of Europe
Taxa named by Hans Rebel